Sherbrooke Lake is a lake in Yoho National Park, British Columbia, Canada. The lake is bounded on the west by Mount Ogden , Mount Niles  to the north, and Paget Peak on the east side. The lake can be reached by following a three km hiking trail that begins from the Trans-Canada Highway across from Wapta Lake.

Sherbrooke Lake also serves as an access point for mountaineering access to the Waputik Icefield and the Scott Duncan Hut.

See also
List of lakes of Yoho National Park

References

External links
 Topographic map of Sherbrooke Lake

Lakes of British Columbia
Yoho National Park
Kootenay Land District